L Peter Deutsch (born Laurence Peter Deutsch on August 7, 1946, in Boston, Massachusetts) is the founder of Aladdin Enterprises and creator of Ghostscript, a free software PostScript and PDF interpreter.

Deutsch's other work includes the Smalltalk implementation that inspired Java just-in-time compilation technology about 15 years later.

Some stories about him are included in the Hackers: Heroes of the Computer Revolution book.

Contributions to computer science
Deutsch wrote the PDP-1 Lisp 1.5 implementation and first REPL, Basic PDP-1 LISP, "while still in short pants" and finished it in 1963, when he was 17 years old. He collaborated with Calvin Mooers on the TRAC programming language and wrote its first implementation, on the PDP-1, in 1964.

From 1964 to 1967, during his study at the University of California, Berkeley, he worked with Butler Lampson and Charles P. Thacker on the Berkeley Timesharing System, which became the standard operating system for the SDS 940 mainframe that would later be used by Tymshare, NLS, and Community Memory.

Deutsch is the author of several Request for Comments (RFCs), The Eight Fallacies of Distributed Computing, and originated the Deutsch limit adage about visual programming languages.

Deutsch received a Ph.D. in computer science from the University of California, Berkeley in 1973, and has previously worked at Xerox PARC and Sun Microsystems. In 1994, he was inducted as a Fellow of the Association for Computing Machinery.

Personal life
Deutsch's father was the physicist Martin Deutsch, a professor at MIT.

Deutsch changed his legal first name from "Laurence" to "L" on September 12, 2007. His published work and other public references before that time generally use the name L. Peter Deutsch (with a dot after the L).

After auditing undergraduate music courses at Stanford University, in January 2009, he entered the postgraduate music program at California State University, East Bay, and was awarded a Master of Arts (M.A.) in March 2011. As of mid-2011, he has had six compositions performed at public concerts, and now generally identifies himself as a composer rather than a software developer or engineer.

References

External links
L. Peter Deutsch's PIVOT program verification system (thesis and source code)
RFCs authored or co-authored by L. Peter Deutsch: RFC 190, RFC 446, RFC 550, RFC 567, RFC 606, RFC 1950, RFC 1951 and RFC 1952

 L Peter Deutsch's web page related to music, including link to scores and MIDI files

1946 births
Free software programmers
Fellows of the Association for Computing Machinery
University of California, Berkeley alumni
Living people
Scientists at PARC (company)